SST: Death Flight is a 1977 American disaster television film directed by David Lowell Rich. The film stars an ensemble cast including Barbara Anderson, Bert Convy, Peter Graves, Lorne Greene, Season Hubley, Tina Louise, George Maharis, Doug McClure, Burgess Meredith, Martin Milner, Brock Peters, Robert Reed, and Susan Strasberg. It follows a crippled supersonic transport (SST) that is refused permission to land due to the threat of spreading a deadly strain of influenza.

The teleplay was written by Robert L. Joseph and Meyer Dolinsky from a story by Guerdon Trueblood. 
David Lowell Rich also directed the airplane disaster films The Horror at 37,000 Feet and The Concorde ... Airport '79.

Plot
On the flight of Maiden 1, the first American supersonic transport, Captain Jim Walsh (Robert Reed) is the assigned pilot on an attempt to set a world speed record from New York to Paris. The flight crew includes the flight engineer (Robert Ito), stewardess Mae (Tina Louise) and steward (Billy Crystal). The select group on the ceremonial first flight include passengers and executives. On board is Willy Basset (Burgess Meredith), the designer of the SST, Tim Vernon (Bert Convy), the Cutlass Airlines head of publicity who is having an affair with "Miss SST" Angela Garland (Misty Rowe), the model who is the public face of the new aircraft. Hank Fairbanks (Doug McClure), an ex-pilot who now works for an airline group in South America as an aircraft buyer, accompanies the other VIPs, and wants to renew an earlier romance with Mae. Other passengers include Paul Whitley (Peter Graves), Bob Connors (John de Lancie), former sportscaster Lyle Kingman (Martin Milner) and his wife Nancy (Susan Strasberg). Harry Carter (Regis Philbin), a television broadcaster and a reporter (Ric Carrott) are at the airport terminal to cover the festivities.

Unfortunately, a disgruntled employee (George Maharis), wanting to  get back at Willy Basset, the designer of the airliner, sabotages the hydraulic system, causing an inflight massive leak of hydraulic fluid. Subsequent repair attempts by the crew cause an explosive decompression that breaks open a medical shipment of Senegal Flu, brought aboard by Dr. Ralph Therman (Brock Peters). Consequently, the aircraft is refused landing rights in Europe. The SST eventually tries to divert to Senegal (the only country with experience in dealing with the virus). However, there is not enough fuel and the pilots are forced to make an emergency landing in a mountain pass.  Some of the passengers are killed, but most survive.

Cast

The principal cast was listed in alphabetical order:

Production

Poor production values predominated in SST: Death Flight. During filming, the production was called Flight of the Maiden. A major historical error was in depicting an American SST as the first of its kind. The aviation sequences utilized a scale model of what was basically a Concorde lookalike with Boeing 747 turbofan engines attached. Other shots were completed using a mock-up of a Lockheed L-2000, a prototype the company had created when Americans were still pursuing their own SST programs.  Airport scenes were filmed at the John F. Kennedy International Airport in New York, where various terminals, runways, boarding areas and cargo loading bays were featured.

Reception
SST: Death Flight premiered on ABC as the Friday Night Movie on February 25, 1977, and subsequently went into syndication as SST: Disaster in the Sky.  For its overseas showings, the film is titled simply Death Flight and has an additional scene featuring nudity that is not present in other versions. In its overseas theatrical showings, the film went by numerous titles including New York Parigi Air Sabotage 78 (New York–Paris, Air Sabotage 78) in Italy.

SST: Death Flight is noted for its formulaic plot and its poor production values.  The television show Mystery Science Theater 3000, where characters watch "bad" movies along with the viewers and make jokes mocking the flaws, showed the film in 1989 during its first season, broadcast on Minneapolis–Saint Paul UHF channel KTMA (now WUCW).

References

Notes

Citations

Bibliography

 Callaway, Tim. "Lockheed L2000." Lockheed Martin (Aviation Classics Magazine Issue 21). 2013.
 Roberts, Jerry. Encyclopedia of Television Film Directors. Lanham, Maryland: Scarecrow Press, 2009. .

External links

 
 

1977 films
1977 television films
1970s disaster films
1970s English-language films
American aviation films
American disaster films
American television films
ABC Motion Pictures films
ABC network original films
Disaster television films
Films about aviation accidents or incidents
Films directed by David Lowell Rich
Films set on airplanes
1970s American films